Chrysaperda collaris is a species of beetle in the family Cerambycidae. It was described by Pascoe in 1888. It is known from Ecuador.

References

Hemilophini
Beetles described in 1888